Inside Men is a British television drama series, consisting of four episodes, transmitted from 2 to 23 February 2012 on BBC One. The series was filmed in Bristol between June and August 2011, with filming taking place over a 10-week period. On 9 March 2012 it was reported the series would not be returning for a second run, being a one-off drama.

Plot
The serial was written by Tony Basgallop. It follows the story of an armed robbery at a secure money counting house in Bristol, the events that lead up to it, characters who work there and the aftermath. It begins with a depiction of the brutal robbery and then explores the motivations of those who committed the crime. The three main characters are John Coniston (Steven Mackintosh), who is the seemingly straightlaced manager of the secure depot; Marcus (Warren Brown), who moves trolleys of cash; and security guard Chris (Ashley Walters).

Critical reception
Andrew Pettie of The Telegraph said of the opening episode; "Steven Mackintosh is the most ordinary actor I have ever seen. Even now, not two hours after watching him play the lead role in Inside Men, I can scarcely remember what he looks like. There is something about his neat features and office-worker pallor that makes Mackintosh both vaguely familiar and instantly forgettable. I can’t think of anyone better at playing nobody in particular."

Cast
 Steven Mackintosh as John Coniston
 Ashley Walters as Chris Gower
 Warren Brown as Marcus Preston
 Kierston Wareing as Gina Jessop
 Paul Popplewell as Tom Armstrong
 Nicola Walker as Kirsty Coinston
 Hannah Merry as Olivia Doyle
 Ruth Gemmell as Rebecca Brewer
 Tom Mannion as Gordon Power
 Rebekah Staton as Sandra Chaplin
 Leila Mimmack as Dita Induani
 Irfan Hussein as Kalpesh Induani
 Gregg Chillin as Riaz Kureshi

Episodes

References

External links
 

2012 British television series debuts
2012 British television series endings
2010s British drama television series
BBC high definition shows
BBC television dramas
2010s British crime television series
British television miniseries
English-language television shows
Television shows set in Bristol